Protein transport protein Sec61 subunit beta is a protein that in humans is encoded by the SEC61B gene.

The Sec61 complex is the central component of the protein translocation apparatus of the endoplasmic reticulum (ER) membrane. The Sec61 complex forms a transmembrane channel where proteins are translocated across and integrated into the ER membrane. This complex consists of three membrane proteins- alpha, beta, and gamma. This gene encodes the beta-subunit protein. The Sec61 subunits are also observed in the post-ER compartment, suggesting that these proteins can escape the ER and recycle back. There is evidence for multiple polyadenylated sites for this transcript.

References

Further reading